Lindiwe Christabola Bebee is a South African politician. She has been serving as a permanent delegate to the National Council of Provinces since May 2019. A member of the African National Congress, she is the whip of the KwaZulu-Natal provincial delegation. From May 2009 to May 2019, Bebee served as a Member of the KwaZulu-Natal Legislature.

Political career
From 2009 to 2019, Bebee served as a Member of the KwaZulu-Natal Legislature for the African National Congress.

Parliamentary career
Bebee was elected to the National Council of Provinces following the 8 May 2019 general election. She was sworn in as an MP on 23 May 2019. Bebee was appointed whip of the KwaZulu-Natal provincial delegation. On 24 June, she was given her committee assignments. She was appointed to the Joint Standing Committee on Intelligence in November 2019.

Committee assignments
Joint Standing Committee on Intelligence
Select Committee on Appropriations
Select Committee on Cooperative Governance and Traditional Affairs, Water and Sanitation and Human Settlements
Select Committee on Finance
Select Committee on Land Reform, Environment, Mineral Resources and Energy
Select Committee on Petitions and Executive Undertakings
Select Committee on Public Enterprises and Communication
Select Committee on Security and Justice

References

External links

Living people
Year of birth missing (living people)
Zulu people
People from KwaZulu-Natal
21st-century South African politicians
21st-century South African women politicians
Members of the KwaZulu-Natal Legislature
Members of the National Council of Provinces
Women members of the National Council of Provinces